Kandilli, formerly Armutçuk, is a town near Karadeniz Ereğli in Zonguldak Province, Turkey. The town was renamed in 2003 from Armutçuk.

Kandilli is located on top of a mountain about 10 km north east of Eregli and about 40 km west of Zonguldak city.  It is about 1 km from the coast of the Black Sea but due to the precipitous cliffs it is not readily accessible. Kandilli used to have a small port facility at the bottom of the cliffs which was accessible using a funicular railway contraption which was still operable as of 2002.

The main industry of the town is a coal mine producing black coal.  A railway exists from Kandilli to the port at Eregli but is not in use.  The route of the railway is scenic and has been suggested by local entrepreneurs as a possible tourist railway.

References

Towns in Turkey
Populated places in Karadeniz Ereğli District